The  U.S. Pro Tennis Championships (for a period from 1951 to 1962 billed as the Cleveland International Pro or Cleveland World Pro Tennis Championships) was the oldest professional tennis tournament played until its final year of 1999 and is considered to have been a professional major from 1927–1967 until the advent of Open Era.  In 1953, 1955, 1956, and 1960, the Cleveland World Pro had a women's draw, with Pauline Betz winning the first three of these, and defeating the reigning U.S. women's champion Doris Hart in the 1956 final. Althea Gibson defeated Pauline Betz in the 1960 women's final.

American's first prominent professional player, Vincent Richards, arranged what became the first U.S. Professionals by negotiating with Doc Kelton to have a tournament played at the Notlek Tennis Club, located at 119th Street and Riverside Drive in Manhattan, New York, on September 23–25, 1927. Richards, tour pro Howard Kinsey and teaching pros from the eastern U.S. comprised the field, with Richards defeating Kinsey in the final in straight sets, a victory which earned him $1,000 first-prize money.

The tournament was subsequently held annually at various locations including the West Side Tennis Club in Forest Hills, New York City, the South Shore Tennis Club in Chicago, in Rye, New York, at the Terrace Club in Brooklyn, the Chicago Town and Tennis Club in Chicago, at the L.A. Tennis Club in Los Angeles, at various clubs around Cleveland, Ohio, and Cleveland Arena in Cleveland. In 1951, two U.S. Pro events were held, one at Cleveland and another at Forest Hills. In 1954, the USPLTA authorized Kramer to hold the U.S. Pro Championships at the L.A. Tennis Club in California, Gonzales winning the event, and the Benrus Cup (emblematic of the U.S. Pro) was awarded to Gonzales. There are two U.S. Pro events listed here for both 1951 (Cleveland and Forest Hills) and for 1954 (Cleveland and L.A. Tennis Club). Gonzales won two U.S. Pro titles in 1954. Its final permanent home was the Longwood Cricket Club in Chestnut Hill, Massachusetts, where it was held from 1964 to 1999. It became part of the  Grand Prix Tennis Tour shortly after the advent of open tennis in 1968. Between 1970 and 1977 it was a prominent tournament of the Grand Prix Super Series. It then became a tennis event within the ATP Tour with reorganization of the top tier of pro tour tennis.

The tournament was later played on Har-Tru clay courts and was initially an important tune-up event for the US Open. But when this Grand Slam tournament moved to hardcourts in 1978, the U.S. Professionals did not follow suit, electing instead to hold its tournament during the US clay court season in early summer instead of during its hitherto pre-Open Era (late summer) time slot. Remaining a clay event into the 1990s, it was a non-ATP exhibition event from 1990 through 1995. During the last stint of the tournament, from 1997 to 1999, it was again an ATP event and was played on hardcourts.

Pancho Gonzales holds the record for most wins with nine, two of those wins in the multiple year of 1954.

Past finals

Singles

Notes:

Doubles

Source:

See also
U.S. Pro Tennis Championships draws, 1927–1945
U.S. Pro Tennis Championships draws, 1946–1967
French Pro Championship
Wembley Championships
Major professional tennis tournaments before the Open Era

References

Bibliography 

 

 
Major tennis tournaments
Defunct tennis tournaments in the United States
Grand Prix tennis circuit
Professional tennis tournaments before the Open Era